The Overland Limited was one of the named passenger trains on the Atchison, Topeka and Santa Fe Railway.

Operating as train Nos. 7 & 8 (sometimes known as the Overland Express) between Chicago, Illinois, and Los Angeles, California, the line was inaugurated in 1901 and ran until the Santa Fe Eight took over the route in 1915. First-class trains included a diner, while second-class trains stopped along the way at Fred Harvey Company eating houses.

See also
 Overland Flyer, later the Overland Limited, of the Union Pacific Railroad
 Passenger train service on the Atchison, Topeka and Santa Fe Railway

References

External links
 Centennial Of The Great Masonic Train Ride aboard the Overland Limited

Passenger trains of the Atchison, Topeka and Santa Fe Railway
Named passenger trains of the United States
Railway services introduced in 1901
Railway services discontinued in 1915